Peace is a Japanese brand of cigarettes, currently owned and manufactured by Japan Tobacco. The brand is produced exclusively in Japan.

History
In January 1946, a 10-pack version of Peace cigarettes was released by the Japanese Ministry of Finance's Monopoly Authority. The name and design of the new issue were publicly offered as "New World", but "the piece" was then adopted from the difficult manufacturing technology. The Peace brand was originally released as a memorial for peace in 1920, after the end of World War I, but sales eventually ceased. The current version "Hope" has no affiliation with the pre-war variant. The current variant was released in hopes of a dream and with hope for a peaceful future in the confusing period after World War II.

The variant made by the Japan Monopoly Authority was the native Higashiyama leaves from the Japanese city of  Ichinoseki of the Iwate Prefecture, which is different from the current Virginia blend.

Peace's logo was designed by Raymond Loewy, the famous U.S. industrial designer who also worked on the pack design of Lucky Strike, in April 1952. A high-priced design fee was a topic of discussion in the era when recognition was still low for commercial design, but as a result of the design change the annual sales number rapidly increased from 2.6 billion to 15 billion. The design changed preferences and the new design became the worldwide standard, as well as greatly influencing future Japanese product designs.

Inspired by Noah's Ark, as depicted in the Old Testament, a symbolic mark (a pigeon with olive leaves) is used on the Hope cigarettes. "A dove that Noah released from the window of the ark to know the state of the outer world where the flood happened. By bringing back leaves together, the great flood ceases and the Earth of relief is closed". Based on the anecdote, the pigeon became a symbol of peace and thus is used on the Peace cigarettes.

In May 2016 (May 28), "ninety-seventh anniversary limited package" was sold in a limited quantity with nine issues, "Peace classic" was sold in limited quantity as a celebration of the 70th anniversary.

Peace cigarettes come in short (70 mm), king size (85 mm), or long (100 mm). They come within a soft or hard pack or steel can, 10 or 20 or 50 cigarettes per pack. It is the first full-fledged Virginia blend type with domestically produced leaves as a main ingredient of Virginia leaves, and the cigarettes have a deep flavour with a "faintly sweet and gentle fragrance" with a vanilla flavour. They are seen as a counterpart to Hope cigarettes.

Products
 Peace 10 / Peace 50 Can (nonfilter, a.k.a. Short Peace)
 Peace Filter Cigarettes (Peace 20, a.k.a. Long Peace)
 Peace Medium
 Peace Lights (Japan) / Peace 10 (Taiwan)
 Peace Super Lights (Japan) / Peace 7 (Taiwan)
 Peace Infinity
 The Peace

Below are all the variants of Peace cigarettes, with the levels of tar and nicotine included.

See also
 Japan Tobacco
 Smoking in Japan

References

Japanese cigarette brands
Japan Tobacco brands